Johnson Hall may refer to:

 Johnson Hall State Historic Site, a U.S. National Historic Landmark in Johnstown, New York
Johnson Hall (Eugene, Oregon), listed on the NRHP in Lane County, Oregon
Johnson Hall-Deseret Mercantile Building, Grantsville, Utah, listed on the NRHP in Tooele County, Utah
 Johnson Hall (Salem)

Architectural disambiguation pages